The al-Muallak Mosque ( Masjid Al-Muallaq,  Misgad Al-Muallak) also known as the Mosque of Zahir al-Umar is a mosque in Acre, Israel.

History
The mosque was built in 1758 by the Arab ruler of Acre, Zahir al-Umar. It was built in a courtyard on the site of a structure commissioned by the Crusaders and which later became the gate to the Genoaese quarter of the city. Up until 1746, the structure was used as a synagogue by Acre's Jewish residents, called the Ramchal Synagogue. The Jews still owned the building when Zahir chose to transform it into a mosque, but compensated them with a different building located in Acre's Jewish quarter. Leftover features of the synagogue include the niche for the Holy Ark and inscriptions in Hebrew.

Architecture
The mosque is positioned along the edge of Acre's Old City market, situated between Khan al-Umdan and Khan al-Ifranj, and is risen over the street. From the outside, the main indicators of the mosque are its low-lying dome and the round base of its former minaret. The mosque's entrance is located beneath the original minaret's base. This minaret was demolished by the municipality of Acre in 1950, citing a public safety risk. The body of the mosque is mainly constituted by a large, square-shaped prayer hall, A triple-domed portico precedes the prayer hall's entrance. Beside the prayer hall is a smaller room that is currently used as a library. A stairway beneath a covered entryway leads into the courtyard.

See also
Jezzar Pasha Mosque

References

Bibliography

Mosques in Acre, Israel
Former synagogues in Israel
Muallak
Muallak
Religious buildings and structures completed in 1758